Unionville is a borough in Centre County, Pennsylvania, United States. It is part of the State College, Pennsylvania Metropolitan Statistical Area. As of the 2010 census, the borough had a total population of 291.

History
A Late Woodland village, now known as the Fisher Farm site, is located along Bald Eagle Creek on Unionville's western edge.

In 1979, the Unionville Historic District was listed on the National Register of Historic Places.  The district, which includes virtually all of Unionville, was added to the Register for its high quality of preservation since before World War I.  Nearly two hundred buildings in the borough qualified as contributing properties.  The well known Ridge Soaring Gliderport is located nearby.

Herman Fisher, founder of the Fisher Price toy and game corporation, was born in Unionville.

Geography
Unionville is located at  (40.90698, -77.87550).

According to the United States Census Bureau, the borough has a total area of 0.3 square miles (0.7 km²), all land.

Demographics

As of the census of 2010, there were 291 people, 123 households, and 83 families residing in the borough. The population density was 1,099.3 people per square mile (424.5/km²). There were 130 housing units at an average density of 491.1 per square mile (189.6/km²). The racial makeup of the borough was 97.6% White, 0.3% Black or African American, 0.7% Asian, 0.7% from other races, and 0.7% from two or more races.  Hispanic or Latino of any race were 0.7% of the population.

There were 123 households, out of which 26.8% had children under the age of 18 living with them, 53.7% were married couples living together, 2.4% had a male householder with no wife present, 11.4% had a female householder with no husband present, and 32.5% were non-families. 26.8% of all households were made up of individuals, and 10.6% had someone living alone who was 65 years of age or older. The average household size was 2.37 and the average family size was 2.84.

In the borough the population was spread out, with 19.2% under the age of 18, 8.7% from 18 to 24, 26.5% from 25 to 44, 31.2% from 45 to 64, and 14.4% who were 65 years of age or older. The median age was 42 years. For every 100 females there were 87.7 males. For every 100 females age 18 and over, there were 85.0 males.

The median income for a household in the borough was $34,792, and the median income for a family was $31,964.  The per capita income for the borough was $21,735.  About 21.7% of families and 22.9% of the population were below the poverty line, including 44.4% of those under the age of 18 and 6.7% of those 65 and older.

References

External links

Populated places established in 1848
Boroughs in Centre County, Pennsylvania
1859 establishments in Pennsylvania